National Road No. 2 is a road in the Democratic Republic of the Congo.  It runs from Mbuji-Mayi through Bukavu, Goma, and terminates at Beni.

In the north, the road runs along the western edge of Virunga National Park until it reaches Kanyabayonga, where it cuts through the park to Rutshuru and then south to Goma, which lies on the northern shore of Lake Kivu around the western shore of Lake Kivu via Katana towards Bukavu. The condition of the road in North Kivu is passable, but from Bukavu to Kitutu, the condition of the road is very poor.

National Road No. 3

South of Kavumu there is a junction with National Road 3, which turns north-west and runs 400 km to Lubutu and then 240 km to the river port of Kisangani, which is the farthest navigable point on the Congo River from the capital Kinshasa. Riverboats and small ships link Kisangani to Kinshasa.

The road had deteriorated over the course of the First and Second Congo Wars and became impassable on the unpaved sections. The road is being rebuilt by the German NGO Welthungerhilfe, which began work in 2000, and was about a quarter complete by June 2006, and about 550 km were completed by 2010.

See also 
 Transport in the Democratic Republic of the Congo

References 

National Road No. 2